"After the Rain" is a song by American glam metal band Nelson, released as a single in 1990.

Critical reception
In review of 5 January 1991 Paul Elliott of Sounds called this song "a seemingly perfect and infallible rock single" and like "(Can't Live Without Your) Love and Affection" is kinda sad yet still kicks ass."

Music video
The song's music video was placed on Noiscreep's list of 10 Unintentionally Funny Heavy Metal Videos.

Charts

References

1990 songs
Songs written by Marc Tanner
Nelson (band) songs